Santosh Gupta (9 January 1925 – 6 August 2004) was a Bangladeshi journalist and writer. He was awarded Ekushey Padak in 1997 and Independence Day Award in 2015 by the Government of Bangladesh. He wrote sometimes under the pen name Aniruddha.

Career

Gupta started his career as journalist in 1957. Later he served as the senior assistant editor of The Sangbad.
He wrote 18 books and edited some 30 books.

Awards

 Ekushey Padak
 Independence Day Award
 Sher-e-Bangla Padak
 Maulana Tarkabagish Padak 
 Jahur Hossain Memorial Padak

References

Further reading

4

Recipients of the Ekushey Padak
Bangladeshi journalists
Bangladeshi Hindus
Bengali Hindus
Recipients of the Independence Day Award
1925 births
2004 deaths
20th-century journalists